Jim Matheny (born February 16, 1936) is a former American football center who played one season with the Toronto Argonauts of the Canadian Football League. He was drafted by the Chicago Cardinals in the 20th round of the 1958 NFL Draft. He played college football at the University of California, Los Angeles and attended Pasadena High School in Pasadena, California. Matheny was also a member of the Houston Oilers of the American Football League.

College career
Matheny played college football for the UCLA Bruins. He averaged over 45 minutes a game his senior year in 1956. He earned Second Team All-America and First Team All-Pacific Coast honors as well as being named Most Valuable Player by his teammates.

Professional career

Toronto Argonauts
Matheny played for the Toronto Argonauts in 1957.

Chicago Cardinals
Matheny was drafted by the Chicago Cardinals with the 231st pick in the 1958 NFL Draft.

Houston Oilers
Matheny was a member of the Houston Oilers during the 1960 off-season.

References

External links
Just Sports Stats

Living people
1936 births
Players of American football from Long Beach, California
Players of Canadian football from Long Beach, California
American football centers
Canadian football centres
American players of Canadian football
UCLA Bruins football players
Toronto Argonauts players
Pasadena High School (California) alumni